The South Atlantic Investment Corporation Building was a historic building in Jacksonville, Florida. It was built in 1925 for the South Atlantic Investment Corporation, and was located at 35-39 West Monroe Street. On December 30, 1992, it was added to the U.S. National Register of Historic Places. It was later demolished to construct the current Jacksonville Main Library.

References

External links
 Duval County listings at National Register of Historic Places
 Florida's Office of Cultural and Historical Programs
 Duval County listings
 S. Atlantic Investment Corporation Building

Buildings and structures in Jacksonville, Florida
History of Jacksonville, Florida
National Register of Historic Places in Jacksonville, Florida
Buildings and structures completed in 1925
1925 establishments in Florida